The  (JHL), is the top professional  handball league in Japan. Team names and home cities/towns are from the official site for the 46th Japan Handball League (2021/2022 Season).

2021/2022 JHL Men's Teams

2021/2022 JHL Women's Teams

References

External links
Official site

Handball competitions in Japan
Sports leagues in Japan
Professional sports leagues in Japan
Japan